Mee Seva is a government service in:

 Mee Seva (Andhra Pradesh)
 Mee Seva (Telangana)